Cora Huber (born 8 April 1981) is a Swiss bobsledder. She competed in the two woman event at the 2006 Winter Olympics.

References

1981 births
Living people
Swiss female bobsledders
Olympic bobsledders of Switzerland
Bobsledders at the 2006 Winter Olympics
People from Cham, Switzerland
Sportspeople from the canton of Zug